Lohara is a village in Adilabad mandal, Adilabad District of Telangana. Administratively, it is under Khandala Gram Panchayat.

Demographics
 census, the village of Lohara had a population of 677.

Notes

Villages in Adilabad district